Freya Perdaens (born 29 January 1989) is a Belgian-Flemish politician active within the N-VA.

Perdaens became a member of the municipal council of Mechelen in 2016. In the municipal elections of 2018, the N-VA Mechelen department chose Perdaens as the list leader. Since then, she has served as leader of the opposition on Mechelen council as an N-VA municipal councilor.

In the elections of 26 May 2019, Perdaens was elected as a Flemish Member of Parliament on the list of the N-VA in the Antwerp Constituency. After the election, she was designated by the N-VA as a state Senator. Perdaens is bisexual and has focused on LGBT rights in her political career.

Notes

1989 births
Living people
People from Mechelen
New Flemish Alliance politicians
Members of the Flemish Parliament
Belgian LGBT politicians
Belgian bisexual people
Members of the Senate (Belgium)
21st-century Belgian politicians
Bisexual politicians